Miles Ahead is an album by Miles Davis that was released in October 1957 by Columbia Records. It was Davis' first collaboration  with arranger Gil Evans following the Birth of the Cool sessions. Along with their subsequent collaborations Porgy and Bess (1959) and Sketches of Spain (1960), Miles Ahead is one of the most famous recordings of Third Stream, a fusion of jazz, European classical, and world musics. Davis played flugelhorn throughout.

Background 
Evans combined the ten pieces that make up the album into a suite, each flowing into the next without interruption; the only exception to this rule was on the title track since it was placed last on side A (this has been corrected on the CD versions). Davis is the only soloist on Miles Ahead, which features a large ensemble consisting of sixteen woodwind and brass players. Art Taylor played drums on the sessions and the then current Miles Davis Quintet member Paul Chambers was the bassist.

A fifth recording date involved Davis alone (re-)recording material to cover or patch mistakes or omissions in his solos using overdubbing. The fact that this album was originally produced in mono makes these inserted overdubbings rather obvious in the new stereo setting.

Critical reception 

The Penguin Guide to Jazz gave Miles Ahead a four-star rating out of a possible four stars, and called the album "a quiet masterpiece... with a guaranteed place in the top flight of Miles albums." Of Davis' flugelhorn, Kevin Whitehead of Cadence wrote that it "seemed to suit [Davis] better than trumpet: more full-bodied, less shrill, it glosses over his technical deficiencies."  The Penguin Guide, on the other hand, opined that "the flugelhorn's sound isn't so very different from his trumpet soloing, though palpably softer-edged....  [S]ome of the burnish seems to be lost."

Album cover 
Davis was reportedly unhappy about the album's original cover, which featured a photograph of a young white woman and child aboard a sailboat. He made his displeasure known to Columbia executive George Avakian, asking, "Why'd you put that white bitch on there?" Avakian later stated that the question was made in jest. For later releases of the record, however, the original cover-photo has been replaced by a photograph of Miles Davis.

Jon Hendricks' vocalization 
Jon Hendricks had been working on vocalizing Miles' parts on the album for over 50 years, and Pete Churchill, on hearing this, approached him to talk about developing it with ensemble the London Vocal Project. Together they finished scoring all the parts and writing the lyrics, for the band parts as well as for Miles, which the LVP then rehearsed extensively. On February 17, 2017, the LVP performed the entire album at St Peter's Church in New York, which was funded by Quincy Jones. The soloists were Anita Wardell, Michele Hendricks, Kevin Fitzgerald Burke, and Jessica Radcliffe.

Track listing 

 "Springsville" (John Carisi) – 3:27
 "The Maids of Cadiz" (Léo Delibes) – 3:53
 "The Duke" (Dave Brubeck) – 3:35
 "My Ship" (Kurt Weill, Ira Gershwin) – 4:28
 "Miles Ahead" (Davis, Evans) – 3:29
 "Blues for Pablo" (Evans) – 5:18
 "New Rhumba" (Ahmad Jamal) – 4:37
 Medley Pt. 1: "The Meaning of the Blues" (Bobby Troup, Leah Worth) – 2:48
 Medley Pt. 2: "Lament" (J. J. Johnson) – 2:14
 "I Don't Wanna Be Kissed (By Anyone but You)" (Harold Spina, Jack Elliot) – 3:05

A current CD reissue contains alternate takes of "Springsville", "Miles Ahead" (incorrectly labeled as being one of "Blues for Pablo"), a complete rehearsal take of "The Meaning of the Blues", "Lament" (recorded as a continuous track by Avakian as a contingency plan) and "I Don't Wanna Be Kissed (By Anyone but You)".

Personnel 

 Miles Davis – Flugelhorn
 Bernie Glow – Lead trumpet
 Ernie Royal – Trumpet
 Louis Mucci – Trumpet
 Taft Jordan – Trumpet
 John Carisi – Trumpet
 Frank Rehak – Trombone
 Jimmy Cleveland – Trombone
 Joe Bennett – Trombone
 Tom Mitchell – Bass trombone
 Willie Ruff – French horn
 Tony Miranda – French horn
 Jim Buffington – French horn
 Bill Barber – Tuba
 Lee Konitz – Alto sax
 Danny Bank – Bass clarinet
 Romeo Penque – Flute and clarinet
 Sid Cooper – Flute and clarinet
 Paul Chambers – Double bass
 Art Taylor – Drums
 Wynton Kelly – Piano
 Gil Evans – Arranger and Conductor

Source: .

References 

1957 albums
Miles Davis albums
Columbia Records albums
Grammy Hall of Fame Award recipients
Albums conducted by Gil Evans
Albums arranged by Gil Evans
Albums produced by Cal Lampley
Albums produced by George Avakian
Cool jazz albums
Albums recorded at CBS 30th Street Studio
Instrumental albums